The Australian Soldier Park, in  Beersheba, Israel is dedicated to  the memory of the Australian Light Horse regiments, that captured the town from the Ottoman Empire during  World War I.

The park was established in 2008 on a large area, and is maintained by a team of its own employees. On its eastern corner there is a memorial statue of a mounted Australian lighthorseman as well as documentary materiel on aluminum boards, written in three languages. The park also includes an area for picnics, gardens, artificial waterfalls, a maze, and a large playground under a circuses-tent-like shade that protects visitors from the desert sunlight.

Most of the playground facilities are fully accessible for children who use wheelchairs. It includes slides one can climb to via a wheelchair ramp, a carousel with two regular benches and two secured places for wheelchairs, hammock and swings one can easily use without sitting straightly and without holding tight, and so on. The handicap parking is located in the middle of the park, much closer to the facilities than the rest of the parking spaces.

The three million dollars of funding for the park was contributed by an Australian fund, and by the Fund for Beersheba Development.

Gallery

See also

List of Australian military memorials

References

External links

Australia–Israel relations
Australian military memorials
Military monuments and memorials in Israel
Beersheba
Parks in Israel